Bessell is a surname. Notable people with the surname include:

Alfred Bessell-Browne (1877–1947), Australian Army colonel and temporary Brigadier-General in World War I
Eric Bessell (1923–1979), Australian politician
Peter Bessell (1921–1985), British politician
Ted Bessell (1935–1996), American television actor
M. S. Bessell, creator of the B–V color index

See also
 Bessel (disambiguation)